Emblemaria is a genus of chaenopsid blennies found throughout the Pacific and Atlantic oceans.

Species
There are currently 16 recognized species in this genus:
 Emblemaria atlantica D. S. Jordan & Evermann, 1898 (Banner blenny)
 Emblemaria australis R. T. C. Ramos, C. R. Rocha & L. A. Rocha, 2003
 Emblemaria biocellata J. S. Stephens, 1970 (Twospot blenny)
 Emblemaria caldwelli J. S. Stephens, 1970 (Caribbean blenny)
 Emblemaria caycedoi Acero P., 1984 (Colombian blenny)
 Emblemaria culmenis J. S. Stephens, 1970 (Ridge blenny)
 Emblemaria diphyodontis J. S. Stephens & Cervigón, 1970 (Venezuelan blenny)
 Emblemaria hudsoni Evermann & Radcliffe, 1917
 Emblemaria hyltoni R. K. Johnson & D. W. Greenfield, 1976 (Filament blenny)
 Emblemaria hypacanthus (O. P. Jenkins & Evermann, 1889) (Gulf signal blenny)
 Emblemaria nivipes D. S. Jordan & C. H. Gilbert, 1883 (Whiteback signal blenny)
 Emblemaria pandionis Evermann & M. C. Marsh, 1900 (Sailfin blenny)
 Emblemaria piratica Ginsburg, 1942 (Sailfin signal blenny)
 Emblemaria piratula Ginsburg & Reid, 1942 (Pirate blenny)
 Emblemaria vitta J. T. Williams, 2002 (Ribbon blenny)
 Emblemaria walkeri J. S. Stephens, 1963 (Elusive signal blenny)

References

 
Chaenopsidae
Taxa named by David Starr Jordan